Mycogone is a genus of fungi belonging to the family Hypocreaceae.

The genus has almost cosmopolitan distribution.

Species

Species:

Mycogone alba 
Mycogone alba 
Mycogone anceps

References

Hypocreaceae
Hypocreales genera